The cactus mouse (Peromyscus eremicus) is a species of rodent in the family Cricetidae.  It is a species of the genus Peromyscus, a closely related group of New World mice often called "deermice". They are native to desert areas of southwestern North America.

Description
Cactus mice are small cricetid rodents, with large eyes and ears, a pointed snout, and a long monocolor tail. Avarage dimensions for P. eremicus are as follows: total length, 160mm to 211mm; length of body, 72mm to 100mm; length of tail, 84mm to 120mm; length of hind foot, 18mm to 22mm; length of ear, 13.4mm to 20.0mm; greatest length of skull, 22.7mm to 25.9mm and zygomatic breadth, 11.2mm to 13.5mm. Females weigh slightly more than males and are significantly larger in body length, ear length, length of mandible, and bullar width of skull. 

Cactus mice can be identified by having naked soles on their hind feet and almost naked flesh-colored tails (as opposed to the furry bicolored tail common in most Peromyscus species), which are usually the same length or longer than the animals' body length. Their ears are nearly hairless, large, and membranous. 

Their fur is long and soft; coloration varies between subspecies and between different populations. Color of fur varies from ochre to cinnamon, with  white ventral areas, and the sides and top of head slightly grayish. Females tend to be slightly paler in color than males, while juveniles appear more gray than their parents.

Distribution

Cactus mice are found in dry desert habitats, steppe, and mountain foothills in arid regions of the southwestern United States and northern Mexico, as well as islands off the coast of the Baja California peninsula and in the Gulf of Mexico. Low average temperatures and lack of the mesquite species Prosopis juliflora might limit northern expansion.

The cactus mouse occurs sympatrically with five other deermouse species, including the California mouse, canyon mouse, Eva's desert mouse, mesquite mouse, and the western deermouse.

Diet 
The cactus mouse feeds on seeds, mesquite beans, hackberry nutlets, insects, and green vegetation. In winter, they rely more on insects; on seeds and flowers in the spring; and seeds, leafy greens, and insects in the summer. In autumn, they transition to their winter diet.

Behavior
Cactus mice, like most muroids, exhibit crepuscular behavior and may even appear in midday, but are mainly nocturnal. They may be less active during the full moon. They have been described as "shy and excitable, and seldom bites when handled". They vocalize a shrill, high pitched squeak when frightened.

Compared to other Peromyscus species, cactus mice have a lower metabolism. This is thought to be an adaptation to arid environments, and maintained by lower activity of the thyroid gland. They may enter torpor when deprived of food in the winter, and food and/or water in the summer. Below , they enter torpor more slowly, which may partially explain their southern distribution. In the laboratory, onset of torpor was observed to occur within half an hour of food deprivation.

They are important as seed predators and as prey items for other animals.

Reproduction
The mating habits of cactus mice are currently not well studied, but are inferred from other Peromyscus species to be promiscuous. They mate year around, but more so during warmer months. Unlike other muroids, male cactus mice have a simple penis, rather than a complex one, and females have two pairs of teats, rather than three. The number of teats in the female cactus mouse correlates with the number of offspring they can raise in their arid environment.
Females mate after about two months, however, male sexual maturity age is unknown.

Relationship with humans

Cactus mice are ideal laboratory animals since they keep clean, live well in captivity, and have a high rate of productivity. They have been proposed for physiological and genetic studies.

There are no known negative effects on humans or human-related activities.

Specimens from Southern California have tested positive for hantavirus, however, infections in this species are likely incidental and localized, rather than a common reservoir.

References

Cactus mouse
Mammals of Mexico
Mammals of the United States
Rodents of North America
Fauna of the Southwestern United States
Fauna of the Baja California Peninsula
Fauna of the California chaparral and woodlands
Fauna of the Chihuahuan Desert
Fauna of the Colorado Desert
Fauna of the Sonoran Desert
Fauna of Gulf of California islands
Mammals described in 1858
Taxonomy articles created by Polbot